William Pearson Grieve (1929- December 20, 2017) was an American bridge player from White Plains, New York. He was educated at Boston University and NYU, and was a computer programmer for IBM.
Grieve won the Reisinger in 3 consecutive years, 1969, 1970, 1971.
Grieve was an avid tennis player.

Bridge accomplishments

Wins

 North American Bridge Championships (7)
 Wernher Open Pairs (1) 1958 
 Mitchell Board-a-Match Teams (1) 1975 
 Chicago Mixed Board-a-Match (1) 1960 
 Reisinger (3) 1969, 1970, 1971 
 Spingold (1) 1959

Runners-up

 North American Bridge Championships (6)
 Open Pairs (1928-1962) (1) 1959 
 Mitchell Board-a-Match Teams (1) 1972 
 Reisinger (1) 1972 
 Spingold (3) 1960, 1966, 1969

Notes

American contract bridge players
2017 deaths
People from White Plains, New York
1929 births
Date of birth missing
Place of birth missing
Boston University alumni
New York University alumni